The charming thicket rat (Thamnomys venustus) is a species of rodent in the family Muridae.  It is described as data deficient as Thamnomys schoutedeni.
It is found in Democratic Republic of the Congo, Rwanda, and Uganda.
Its natural habitat is subtropical or tropical moist montane forests.
It is threatened by habitat loss.

References

 Dieterlen, F. 2004.  Thamnomys schoutedeni.   2006 IUCN Red List of Threatened Species.   Downloaded on 20 July 2007.
 Dieterlen, F. & Schlitter, D. 2004.  Thamnomys venustus.   2006 IUCN Red List of Threatened Species.   Downloaded on 20 July 2007.

Thamnomys
Mammals described in 1907
Taxa named by Oldfield Thomas
Taxonomy articles created by Polbot